Botachidae or Botachidai was a village in ancient Arcadia, in the territory of Tegea.

Its site is unlocated.

References

Populated places in ancient Arcadia
Former populated places in Greece
Lost ancient cities and towns